Gonice  is a village in the administrative district of Gmina Września, within Września County, Greater Poland Voivodeship, in west-central Poland.

References

Gonice